The Anglican Diocese of Ikwerre is one of twelve within the Anglican Province of the Niger Delta, itself one of 14 provinces within the Church of Nigeria. The current bishop is Blessing Enyindah. Enyindah was consecrated a bishop on April 18, 2007 at the Cathedral of the Good Shepherd, Enugu; the diocese was inaugurated on April 20, and Enyindah later became Archbishop of Niger Delta Province on July 11, 2021.

Notes

Church of Nigeria dioceses
Dioceses of the Province of Niger Delta